The list of early inscriptions in northern Vietnam comprises a list of the corpus of known inscriptions written in Chinese language and Vietnamese language mostly using Chinese characters and few using Chu Nom script from c. 300s to 1230s found in northern Vietnam.

Chinese period (c. 0–900 AD)

Postclassic – Early Dai Viet period (900–1230)

Footnotes

References

 
 
 
 
 

 
 
 

Vietnam
Inscriptions
Inscriptions
Vietnamese writing systems